Didymocarpus is a genus of flowering plants in the family Gesneriaceae and typical of the tribe Didymocarpeae. There are about 100 known species distributed in India, Nepal, Bhutan, Myanmar, southern China, Vietnam, Laos, Cambodia, Thailand, and the Malay Peninsula, with one species extending up to northern Sumatra. Some members of the genus are known for their medicinal properties, especially to cure diseases related to the kidneys.

Description 
The members of the genus are typically small perennial, deciduous herbs with annual flowering stems. Flowering shoots are produced from the basal rootstock or condensed rhizome during the onset of rainy season which dies after producing the fruits. Leaves are opposite, decussate and mostly unequal within pairs. The inflorescence is pair-flowered cyme, typical of the Gesneriad family, with few to many flowers. The calyx is often united for more than half of its length or rarely free to the base. The corolla is tubular, widening towards the mouth with a bilabiate limbs. The flowers are devoid of nectar are subtended by brightly colored bracteoles. Floral color can be hues of reds, oranges, yellows, and violet often with stripes on the lobes. The flower has two stamens with slender filaments and cohering anthers. The ovary is cylindrical with often with stipe and an entirely capitate stigma. Fruit capsules are straight, orthocarpic, bivalved, and dehisce loculicidally.

Taxonomy 
The genus Didymocarpus was described by Nathaniel Wallich in 1819 based on specimens he received from Nepal. Due to lack of a clear definition of the generic boundaries, more than 180 species and 450 names were affiliated to this genus over the time. These included many morphologically distinct species from Madagascar, Western ghats of India and Southeast Asia. The genus was remodeled and redefined by Weber and Burt in 1998 with about 80 species. Recently, many new species were described from India, China and Thailand and the genus now comprises about 100 species.

Species
The Catalogue of Life lists:

 Didymocarpus acuminatus
 Didymocarpus adenocalyx
 Didymocarpus adenocarpus
 Didymocarpus albicalyx
 Didymocarpus andersonii
 Didymocarpus antirrhinoides
 Didymocarpus aromaticus
 Didymocarpus aurantiacus
 Didymocarpus aureoglandulosus
 Didymocarpus bancanus
 Didymocarpus barbinervius
 Didymocarpus bhutanicus
 Didymocarpus bicolor
 Didymocarpus biserratus
 Didymocarpus bracteatus
 Didymocarpus burkei
 Didymocarpus cinereus
 Didymocarpus citrinus
 Didymocarpus corchorifolius
 Didymocarpus cordatus
 Didymocarpus cortusifolius
 Didymocarpus curvicapsa
 Didymocarpus denticulatus
 Didymocarpus dongrakensis
 Didymocarpus elatior
 Didymocarpus epithemoides
 Didymocarpus gageanus
 Didymocarpus geesinkianus
 Didymocarpus glandulosus
 Didymocarpus graciliflorus
 Didymocarpus grandidentatus
 Didymocarpus heucherifolius
 Didymocarpus hookeri
 Didymocarpus insulsus
 Didymocarpus kerrii
 Didymocarpus labiatus
 Didymocarpus leiboensis
 Didymocarpus lineicapsa
 Didymocarpus macrophyllus
 Didymocarpus margaritae
 Didymocarpus medogensis
 Didymocarpus megaphyllus
 Didymocarpus mengtze
 Didymocarpus mollis
 Didymocarpus mortonii
 Didymocarpus nanophyton
 Didymocarpus newmannii
 Didymocarpus nigrescens
 Didymocarpus oblongus
 Didymocarpus ovatus
 Didymocarpus parryorum
 Didymocarpus paucinervius
 Didymocarpus pedicellatus
 Didymocarpus perakensis
 Didymocarpus platycalyx
 Didymocarpus podocarpus
 Didymocarpus poilanei
 Didymocarpus praeteritus
 Didymocarpus primulifolius
 Didymocarpus pseudomengtze
 Didymocarpus pteronema
 Didymocarpus pulcher
 Didymocarpus punduanus
 Didymocarpus purpureobracteatus
 Didymocarpus purpureopictus
 Didymocarpus purpureus
 Didymocarpus reniformis
 Didymocarpus robustus
 Didymocarpus rufipes
 Didymocarpus salviiflorus
 Didymocarpus silvarum
 Didymocarpus sinoprimulinus
 Didymocarpus sinoindicus
 Didymocarpus stenanthos
 Didymocarpus stenocarpus
 Didymocarpus subpalmatinervis
 Didymocarpus sulphureus
 Didymocarpus triplotrichus
 Didymocarpus tristis
 Didymocarpus wattianus
 Didymocarpus wengeri
 Didymocarpus venosus
 Didymocarpus villosus
 Didymocarpus violaceus
 Didymocarpus yuenlingensis
 Didymocarpus yunnanensis
 Didymocarpus zhenkangensis
 Didymocarpus zhufengensis

References

External links
 
 

Flora of Indo-China
Flora of Malesia
Gesneriaceae genera
Didymocarpoideae